West Fraser Timber Co. Ltd. is a Canadian forestry company that produces lumber, LVL, MDF, OSB, plywood, pulp, newsprint, and wood chips based in Vancouver B.C., Canada.  
West Fraser Timber Co. Ltd. is a member of the Forest Products Association of Canada.

West Fraser Timber Co. Ltd. was twice recognized as one of Canada's Most Admired Corporate Cultures and five times as Canada's Top 100 Employers in 2017. Also, the company was recently named for the fourth time as one of Canada's Top 100 Employers and Canada's Best Employer for Recent Graduates for 2018.

History 
West Fraser was founded by three brothers from Seattle: Pete, Bill and Sam Ketcham in 1955. The three brothers decided to do business together and purchased a small planing mill in Quesnel, British Columbia. Over the years the company grew, "West Fraser has become the largest lumber manufacturer in North America with 8,600 employees globally – about 5,000 in Western Canada – at about 50 locations."

In April 2020, it was revealed that Jim Pattison had upped his stake in West Fraser to 13.8% ownership, prompting speculation that the Canadian billionaire had plans to merge the company with Canfor, of which he owns 51%. In response, West Fraser adopted a shareholder rights plan or "poison pill" in order to defend against any attempts at a takeover.

References

External links
West Fraser Timber

Companies listed on the New York Stock Exchange
Companies listed on the Toronto Stock Exchange
Pulp and paper companies of Canada
Forestry in Canada